is the pseudonym of a Japanese manga artist. He is most known for the manga series Strawberry Marshmallow, which has been made into an anime series and OVA. He also had a part in the Weekly Dearest My Brother series.

External links
 
 

1980 births
Living people
People from Hamamatsu
Manga artists from Shizuoka Prefecture
Pseudonymous artists